Roger Downes (died 1638) was an English lawyer and politician who sat in the House of Commons in 1601 and from 1621 to 1622.

Downes was the son Roger Downes of Shrigley, Cheshire. He was a student of Staple Inn and then of  Gray's Inn in  1589 and was called to the bar in 1599. In 1601, he was elected Member of Parliament for Wigan. At about this time, he acquired Wardley Hall, a moated manor house with a private chapel and twenty bedrooms. He was  summer reader for Grey's Inn in 1615. In 1621 he was elected MP for Wigan again. He was dean of the chapel of Gray's Inn in 1624. In 1625 he was vice-chamberlain of Cheshire. He was treasurer of Gray's Inn in 1628.

Downes died in 1638 and was buried in Wigan on 6 July.

Downes' first marriage was to Elizabeth Gerard, daughter of Miles Gerard of Ince, and took place in Wigan on 23 April 1601. She gave birth to a son, but he died in 1602. Downes' second marriage was to Anne Calvert, daughter of John Calvert of Cockeram. She bore two sons and one daughter. Anne was a Catholic, and their second son, Francis, who was also MP for Wigan, later converted.

References

Year of birth missing
1638 deaths
Members of Gray's Inn
English MPs 1601
English MPs 1621–1622